The elections to the two houses of legislatures of the Bombay Presidency were held in 1937, as part of the nationwide provincial elections in British India. The Indian National Congress was the single largest party by winning 86 of 175 seats in the Legislative Assembly and 13 of 60 seats in the Legislative Council.

The Congress Government that was formed after the elections under B. G. Kher lasted till October 1939, when it resigned protesting India's involvement in the Second World War. The next election was held in 1946.

Government of India Act of 1935 
The Government of India Act of 1935 abolished dyarchy and ensured provincial autonomy. It created a  bicameral legislature in the Bombay province. The Legislature consisted of the Governor and two Legislative bodies - a Legislative Assembly and a Legislative Council. The Assembly consisted of 175 members who were further classified into General seats and those reserved for special communities and interests. The Legislative Council consisted of 60 members. It was a permanent body not subject to dissolution by the Gover
The Act provided for a limited adult franchise based on property qualifications.

Results
The Congress contested 110 out of the total 175 seats in the assembly out of which 97 were general constituencies. For the council, it contested 15 out of the 26 seats where elections took place.

In the assembly, 15 seats were reserved for the Scheduled Castes. Out of these, Congress Party secured one seat unopposed and contested 8 seats out of which it won 5.

Legislative Assembly
Party wise break up of seats in the Bombay Legislative Assembly:

Total Number of Seats : 175

General (115): 
Ahmedabad: Ganesh Vasudev Mavalankar (Ahmedabad City, Urban) (Speaker), Trikamlal Ugarchand Vakil (Ahmedabad City), Hariprasad Pitamber Mehta (Ahmedabad North), Bhogilal Dhirajlal Lala (Ahmedabad North), Ishvarlal Kalidas Vyas (Ahmedabad South)
Ahmednagar: Laxman Madhav Patil (Ahmednagar North), Keshav Balwant Deshmukh (Ahmednagar North, General Rural), Ramchandra Bhagwant Girme (Ahmednagar North, General Rural), Namdeo Eknath Navle (Ahmednagar North), Prabhakar Janardan Roham (Ahmednagar South, General Rural), Ganesh Krishna Chitale (Ahmednagar South), Kundanmal Sobhachand Firodia (Ahmednagar South)
Belgaum: Anna Babaji Latthe (Belgaum North), Balwant Hanmant Varale (Belgaum North), Narayanrao Gururao Joshi (Belgaum North) (Deputy Speaker), Malgouda Pungouda Patil (Belgaum North), Keshav Govind Gokhale (Belgaum South, General Rural), Parappa Chanbasappa Jakati (Belgaum South, Rural), Kallangouda Shiddangouda Patil (Belgaum South)
Bijapur: Murigeppa Shiddappa Sugandhi (Bijapur North), Revappa Somappa Kale (Bijapur North), Shankreppagouda Basalingappagouda Desai (Bijapur South, General Rural), Shankargouda Timmangouda Patil (Bijapur South)
Bombay: Khurshed Nariman (Bombay City (Fort, Mandvi, Bhuleshwar and Girgaum)), S. K. Patil (Bombay City (Fort, Mandvi, Bhuleshwar and Girgaum)), Nagindas Tribhuvandas Master (Bombay City (Fort, Mandvi, Bhuleshwar and Girgaum)), B. R. Ambedkar (Bombay City (Byculla & Parel) General Urban), Dr. Manchersha Dhanjibhoy Gilder (Bombay City (Byculla & Parel) General Urban), B.G. Kher (Bombay City North and Bombay Suburban District), Dattatraya Wandrekar (Bombay City North and Bombay Suburban District), Savlaram Gundaji Songavkar (Bombay City North and Bombay Suburban District), 
Broach: Chhotalal Balkrishna Purani (Broach Sub-division, General Rural)
Dharwar: Siddappa Kambli (Dharwar North, Rural), Andaneppa Dnyanappa Dodmeti (Dharwar North, General Rural), Girimallappa Rachappa Nalwadi (Dharwar North, General Rural), Vishwanathrao Narayanrao Jog (Dharwar North), Shripad Shyamji Kargudri (Dharwar South, Rural), Thimmappa Rudrappa Neshvi (Dharwar South)
Kaira: Bhailbhai Ukabhai Vaghela (Kaira District, General Rural), Babubhai Jasbhai Patel, Bhailalbhai Bhikabhai Patel, Fulsinhji Dabhi, 
Kanara: Sheshgiri Narayanrao Keshwain (Kanara District, General Rural), Mahableshwar Ganpati Bhatt Gopi (Kanara District, General Rural), Ningappa Fakeerappa Hallikeri
Khandesh: Gulabsing Bhila Girasey (West Khandesh East, General Rural), Namdeorao Budhajirao Marathe (West Khandesh East), Raghunath Balkrishna Wadekar (West Khandesh East),  Damji Posala Gavit (West Khandesh West), Mangesh Babhuta Patel (West Khandesh West), Daulatrao Gulaji Jadhav (East Khandesh East, General Rural), Rajmal Lakhichand Marwadi (East Khandesh East), Dhanaji Nana Choudhari (East Khandesh East), Hari Vinayak Pataskar (East Khandesh West), Gambhirrao Avachitrao Patil (East Khandesh West), Narhar Rajaram Patil (East Khandesh West), Maganlal Nagindas (East Khandesh West), 
Kolaba: Ramchandra Narayan Mandlik, Laxman Govind Patil, Dattatraya Kashinath Kunte, Kamalaji Ragho Talkar
Nasik: Raosaheb Bhausaheb Thorat (Nasik East, General Rural), Lalchand Hirachand (Nasik East, General Rural), Bhaurao Sakharam Hiray (Nasik East), Govind Hari Deshpande (Nasik West, General Rural), Vasant Narayan Naik (Nasik West, General Rural), Bhaurao Krishnaji Gaikwad (Nasik West), Prithwiraj Amolakchand Nimanee (Nasik West)
Panch Mahals: Laxmidas Mangaldas Shrikant (Panch Mahals East, General Rural), Wamanrao Sitaram Mukadam (Panch Mahals West, General Rural), Maneklal Gandhi (Panch Mahals West)
Poona: Bhalchandra Maheshwar Gupte (Poona City, General Urban), Vithalrao Laxmanrao Thube (Poona West, General Rural), Hari Vithal Tulpule (Poona West, General Rural), Balaji Bhawansa Walwekar (Poona East, Rural), Appaji Yeshwantrao Kate (Poona East), Vinayak Atmaram Gadkari (Poona East)
Ratnagiri: Babjeerao Narayanrao Rane (Ratnagiri North, General Rural), Shivram Laxman Karandikar (Ratnagiri North, Rural), Gangadhar Raghoram Ghatge (Ratnagiri North), Anant Vinayak Chitre (Ratnagiri North), Bachajee Ramchandra Rane (Ratnagiri South, General Rural), Purshottam Wasudeo Wagh (Ratnagiri South), Shankar Krishnaji Gavankar (Ratnagiri South), Shamrao Vishnu Parulekar (Ratnagiri South)
Satara: Dhanjishah Bomanjee Cooper (Satara North), Shankar Hari Sathe (Satara North, General Rural), Khanderao Sakharam Savat (Satara North, General Rural), Bajirao Jagdeorao Shinde (Satara North, General Rural), Pandurang Keshav Shiralkar (Satara South, General Rural), Shankar Pandurang Mohite (Satara South, General Rural), Annappa Narayan Kalyani (Satara South), Atmaram Nana Patil (Satara South), Ramchandra Krishna Karavade (Satara South) 
Solapur: Krisnaji Bhimrao Antrolikar (Solapur City, General Urban), Jivappa Subhana Aidale (Solapur North-east, General Rural), Bhagwan Sambhuppa Kathale (Solapur North-east, General Rural), Tulshidas Subhanrao Jadhav (Solapur North-east), Jayavant Ghanshyam More (Solapur South-west, General Rural), Dattatraya Trimbak Aradhye (Solapur South-west)
Surat: Champaklal Jeikisandas Ghia (Surat & Rander Cities, Urban), Morarji Desai (Surat District, General Rural), Morarbhai Kasanji (Surat District, General Rural), Randhir Prasavandas Desai (Surat District, General Rural), Purushottam Lalji Chohan (Surat District)
Thana: Dattatraya Waman Raut (Thana North, General Rural), Govind Dharmaji Vartak (Thana North, Rural), Vishnu Vaman Dandekar (Thana North), Kanji Govind Shet (Thana South, General Rural), Ganesh Krishna Phadke (Thana South) 
Muhammadan (29):
Urban: Husein Aboobaker Baig Mohamed (Bombay City South, Muhammadan Urban), Mohamedally Allabux (Bombay City South, Urban), Mahmad Yasin Nurie (Ahmedabad City, Urban), Ali Muhammad Khan Dehlavi (Surat and Rander Cities, Urban)
Rural: Ibrahim Ismail Chundrigar (Ahmedabad District, Rural), Mahomedbawa Madhubawa Patel (Ahmednagar District), Abdulmajeed Abdulkhadar Gheewale (Belgaum District), Allisa Nabisa Ilkal (Bijapur District, Muhammadan Rural), Khalilulla Abasheb Janvekar (Bijapur District), Ali Bahadur Bahadur Khan (Bombay City North and Bombay Suburban District Urban Muhammadan Rural), Mahomed Musa Killedar (Bombay City North and Bombay Suburban District), Asmal Musa Abhram (Broach Sub-division, Muhammadan Rural), Musaji Eusufji Patel (Broach Sub-division), Sardar Mahaboobali Khan Akbarkhan Savanur (Dharwar District, Muhammadan Rural), Abdul Karim Aminsab Hanagi (Dharwar District), Khan Saheb Faiz Mahamadkhan Mahobatkhan (Kaira District, Muhammadan Rural), Ismail Hassan Bapu Shiddika (Kanara District, Muhammadan Rural), Ismail Hasan Siddiqui (Kanara District), Shaikh Mohamad Hasan (East Khandesh District, Muhammadan Rural), Mohemed Suleman Cassum Mitha (East Khandesh District), Shaikh Mohamad Hasan (East Khandesh District), Mohsin Mohamed A. Bhaiji (Kolaba District), Khwaja Bashiruddin Khwaja Moinuddin Kazi (West Khandesh District, Muhammadan Rural), Fazal Ibrahim Rahimtoola (Kolaba District, Muhammadan Rural), Abdul Rahim Baboo Hakeem (Nasik District), Abdulla Haji Isa Bhagat (Panch Mahals Sub-division), Khan Bahadur Shaikh Jan Mahomed Haj Shaikh Kalla (Poona District, Muhammadan Rural), Aziz Gofur Kazi (Ratnagiri District, Muhammadan Rural), Haji Ahmad Kasam Kachhi (Satara District), Yusuf Abdulla (Satara District), Abdul Latif Haji Hajrat Khan (Solapur District, Muhammadan Rural), Ahmed Ebrahim Singapori (Surat District), Sardar Haji Amirsaheb Mohiddin Saheb Rais (Thana District, Muhammadan Rural)
Women (6): Annapurna Gopal Deshmukh (Bombay City (Girgaum), Women's General Urban), Lilavati Kanaiyalal Munshi (Bombay City (Bhuleshwar), Women's General Urban), Salima Faiz B. Tyabji (Bombay City (Girgaum), Women's Muhammadan Urban), Laxmibai Ganesh Thuse (Poona City, Women's General Urban), Vijayagauri Balvantrai Kanuga (Ahmedabad City, General Urban), Nagamma Veerangouda Patil (Dharwar Women's General Rural)
University (1): Kanaiyalal Maneklal Munshi
Commerce & Industry: Sir John Abercombie (Bombay Chamber of Commerce & Bombay Presidency Trades Association), J. B. Greaves (Bombay Chamber of Commerce & Bombay Presidency Trades Association), Donald Hill (Bombay Chamber of Commerce & Bombay Presidency Trades Association), Sakarlal Balabhai (Ahmedabad Millowners' Association, Commerce & Industry), Sorabji Dorabji Saklatvala (Bombay Millowners' Association, Commerce & Industry), Bhawanji Khimji (East India Cotton Association), M. C. Ghia (Indian Merchants' Chamber)
Labour (7): Gulzarilal Nanda (Ahmedabad Textile Unions), Khondubhai Kasanji Desai (Ahmedabad Textile Unions), Jamnadas Mehta (Railway Unions), Shavaksha Hormusji Jhabvala (Railway Unions), Dadasaheb Khaserao Jagtap (Bombay City & Suburban Textile Unions), Ramchandra Amraji Khedgikar (Solapur City (Textile Labour), Labour), Akhtar Hasan Mirza (Trade Unions of Seamen and Dockworkers)
European (3): W. W. Russell (Bombay City cum Bombay Suburban District, European), Francis Holroy French (Presidency), David Watson (Presidency), Cyril Frederick Golding
Indian Christian (3): Dr. Joseph Altino Collaco (Bombay City, Urban), Dominic Joseph Ferreira (Thana cum Bombay Suburban District), Bhaskarrao Bhaurao Chakranarayan (Poona cum Ahmednagar, Rural)
Anglo-Indian (2): Stanley Henry Prater (Bombay City cum Bombay Suburban District), Fred J. Currion (Presidency)
Landholders: Sardar Narayanrao Ganpatrao Vinchoorkar (Deccan Sardars and Inamdars), Girjaprasad Chinubhai Madhavlal (Gujarat Sardars and Inamdars)

Legislative Council

Party wise break up of seats in the Bombay Legislative Council:

Total Number of Seats : 30

General (20): Dadubhai Purshotamdas Desai (Ahmedabad cum Kaira, General Rural), Chinubhai Lallubhai Mehta (Ahmedabad cum Kaira, General Rural), Behram Naoroji Karanjia (Bombay City cum Bombay Suburban District, General Urban), Ratilal Munji Gandhi (Bombay City cum Bombay Suburban District, General Urban), Prof. Sohrab Davar (Bombay City cum Bombay Suburban District), Hansa Jivraj Mehta (Bombay City cum Bombay Suburban District, General Rural), Mangal Das Pakvasa (Broach and Panch Mahals cum Surat, General Rural), Shantilal Harjiwan Shah (Broach and Panch Mahals cum Surat, General Rural), Narsingrao Shriniwasrao Desai (Dharwar cum Kanara, General Rural), Subray Ramchandra Haldipur (Dharwar cum Kanara, General Rural), Mahadeo Bajajee Virkar (Kolaba cum Ratnagiri, General Rural), Madhavrao Gopalrao Bhosle (East Khandesh cum West Khandesh, General Rural), Premraj Shaligram Marwadi (East Khandesh cum West Khandesh, General Rural), Atmaram Mahadeo Atawane (Kolaba cum Ratnagiri, General Rural), Dr. Ganesh Sakharam Mahajani (Poona cum Satara, General Rural), Ramchandra Ganesh Soman (Poona cum Satara, General Rural), Chandrappa Baswantrao Desai (Solapur cum Belgaum cum Bijapur, General Rural), Bheemji Balaji Potdar (Solapur cum Belgaum cum Bijapur, General Rural), Narayan Damodhar Deodhekar (Thana cum Nasik cum Ahmednagar, General Rural), Ramchandra Ganesh Pradhan (Thana cum Nasik cum Ahmednagar, General Rural),
Muhammadan (5): Fazalbhoy Currimbhoy (Bombay City cum Bombay Suburban District, Muhammadan Rural), K. A. Hamied (Bombay City cum Bombay Suburban District, Muhammadan Rural), Khan Sahab Abdul Kadir Abdul Aziz Khan (Central Division, Muhammadan Rural), Khan Sahab Mahomed Makan (Northern Division, Muhammadan Rural), Mahomed Amin Wazee Mohomad Tambe (Southern Division, Muhammadan Rural)
European (1): Frederick Stones (Presidency, European)
Nominated (3): Terence Martin Guido, S. C. Joshi, Dr. Purushottambhai Solanki, Major Sardar Bhimrao Nagojirao Patankar

Government formation
Although the Indian National Congress won the elections, the party declined to form the government. The Governor Sir George Lloyd invited Sir Dhanjishah Cooper (independent member from Satara North constituency ), to form an interim ministry. The Cooper ministry did not last long and a Congress ministry under B. G. Kher was sworn.

References 

1937 elections in India
Bombay Presidency
1937 in India
Elections in Maharashtra
Elections in Gujarat
Elections in Karnataka
Political history of Karnataka
Bombay